Kwadwo Baah-Wiredu (1952 – 24 September 2008) was a Ghanaian politician and a chartered accountant. He was  Member of Parliament in the Parliament of Ghana for Asante Akim North Constituency from January 1997 until his death on September 24, 2008. He served as a Minister of state at different ministries under the Kufuor government from 2001.

Early life and education
Baah-Wiredu was born in Asante Akim Agogo. He started his secondary education at the Kumasi High School, Kumasi in 1967. He obtained the GCE Ordinary Level Certificate in 1972. He had his sixth form education at Prempeh College, also in Kumasi. Baah-Wiredu proceeded to the University of Ghana in 1974 and obtained a B.Sc. in Administration (Accounting option). He then did a four-year course with the Institute of Chartered Accountants qualifying as a chartered accountant in 1985.

Career
Kwadwo Baah-Wiredu worked within various positions with Ghana Airways and Volta River Authority. He worked as a senior consultant on computer-systems and as finance manager of Ananse Systems. Prior to being a member of Parliament, he was a partner in Asante Wiredu and Associates, an accounting firm.

Politics

Member of Parliament 
Baah-Wiredu began his political career in 1997 after emerging the winner of the 1996 Ghanaian General Election. He was one of the campaigners against the Union government (UNIGOV) concept promoted by General Acheampong's Supreme Military Council in 1978. He joined the New Patriotic Party when it was formed in 1992. He became an MP in the Second Parliament of the Fourth Republic after the 1996 parliamentary elections and since retained his seat.

Minister of state 
He became a Minister in John Kufuor's NPP government in 2001. He held the portfolios of Local Government and Rural Development (2001–2003) and Education, Youth and Sports (2003–2005).He became the Minister for Finance and Economic Planning in 2005. In 2005, he was the first Finance Minister in Ghana's history to present the country's Budget Statement and Economic Policy to Parliament before the arrival of that fiscal year with his budget for the fiscal year 2006. Since then, this has become a norm for all successive Finance Ministers.

Elections 
In the year 2000, Baah-Wiredu won the general elections as the member of parliament for the Asante Akim North  constituency of the Ashanti Region of Ghana. He won on the ticket of the New Patriotic Party. His constituency was a part of the 31 parliamentary seats out of 33 seats won by the New Patriotic Party in that election for the Ashanti Region. The New Patriotic Party won a majority total of 99 parliamentary seats out of 200 seats. He was elected with 32,341 votes out of 45,227 total valid votes cast. This was equivalent to 72.3% of the total valid votes cast. He was elected over Kofi Opoku Manu of the National Democratic Congress, Kwabena Anafi of the Convention People's Party, James K. Baah of the People's National Convention,  Emmanuel K. Adade of the New Reformed Party and Joseph B Frimpong of the United Ghana Movement. These won 11,852, 168, 151, 130 and 75 votes out of the total valid votes cast respectively. These were equivalent to 26.5%, 0.4%, 0.3%, 0.3% and 0.2% respectively of total valid votes cast.

Baah-Wiredu was elected as the member of parliament for the Asante Akim North constituency of the Ashanti Region of Ghana  in the 2004 Ghanaian general elections. He won on the ticket of the New Patriotic Party. His constituency was a part of the 36 parliamentary seats out of 39 seats won by the New Patriotic Party in that election for the Ashanti Region. The New Patriotic Party won a majority total of 128 parliamentary seats out of 230 seats.  He was elected with 40,497 votes out of 53,098 total valid votes cast equivalent to 76.3% of total valid votes cast. He was elected over Atobrah Isaac of the Peoples’ National Convention, Thomas Osei Bonsu Nkansah of the National Democratic Congress and Kwabena Anarfi of the Convention People's Party. These obtained 0.8%, 21.6% and 1.3% respectively of total valid votes cast.

Personal life 
Baah-Wiredu was married with 6 children.

Death
On 24 September 2008, Baah-Wiredu died in South Africa where he had been receiving medical treatment for a short illness.

References

1952 births
2008 deaths
Ghanaian MPs 1997–2001
Ghanaian MPs 2001–2005
People from Agogo, Ghana
Ghanaian MPs 2005–2009
University of Ghana alumni
Education ministers of Ghana
Finance ministers of Ghana
Sports ministers of Ghana
Local government ministers of Ghana
New Patriotic Party politicians
People from Ashanti Region
Kumasi High School alumni